Guaranty Bank & Trust, a subsidiary of Guaranty Bancshares, Inc. founded in 1913, is a Texas-based commercial bank that offers personal and business banking services.

Tyson Abston serves as President, CEO and chairman of both Guaranty Bank & Trust and Guaranty Bancshares.

Guaranty Bank & Trust has locations in Bryan, Paris, Texarkana, Sulphur Springs, Bogata, Commerce, Pittsburg, New Boston, Mount Pleasant, Mount Vernon, Longview, Hallsville, College Station, Royse City, Denton, Houston, Conroe, Katy, Austin, Fort Worth, Rockwall and North Dallas. Headquarters are in Addison, Texas.

History

The Texas Department of Banking issued a charter to Guaranty State Bank on January 20, 1913. The bank’s name changed to Guaranty Bond State Bank in 1927.

In 1979, the bank added trust powers. The following year Guaranty created Guaranty Bancshares Inc., its holding company. In 1981, the bank changed its name to Guaranty Bank.

In 2002, the bank changed its name from Guaranty Bank to Guaranty Bond Bank.

In 2014, the bank changed its name from Guaranty Bond Bank to Guaranty Bank & Trust. The bank was ranked 15th best bank to work for in the United States by American Banker in 2016.

Ownership

From its founding in 1913 until 1998, Guaranty Bank & Trust was a privately held company. Guaranty Bank & Trust's parent company, Guaranty Bancshares, became listed under the symbol “GNTY” on the NASDAQ Exchange.

In June 2005, Guaranty Bancshares de-listed from the Nasdaq exchange and became privately held company.

In May 2017, Guaranty Bancshares Inc. underwent an IPO and was listed on the NASDAQ Exchange under the "GNTY" symbol.

In March 2023, Guaranty Bancshares Inc. transferred their listing to NYSE under the “GNTY” symbol.

Locations

In April 1994, the first location in Paris, Texas opened. Guaranty Bank & Trust also opened its second Mount Pleasant location in 1996. The bank opened a full-service location in Texarkana in 1997. In April 1999, Guaranty opened a location in Pittsburg, Texas.

Guaranty Bank & Trust opened a loan production office in August 2000 in Fort Stockton, Texas. The Fort Stockton location became a full service bank in December of that same year. In March 2004, Guaranty Bank & Trust opened a location in Mount Vernon, Texas. In August 2004, the Deport location was closed, with customers transferred to nearby towns’ branches. A second Texarkana location opened in July that same year. In 2008, Guaranty Bank & Trust closed its Talco location. The following year, it opened a location in New Boston, Texas. In 2010, Guaranty Bank & Trust added both a mobile bank and another full service branch in Texarkana.

A location was opened in Atlanta, Texas in May 2011. In April 2013, Guaranty Bank & Trust opened its second Paris, Texas location. New locations were added in Longview and College Station in 2013. In June 2014, a location was opened in Bryan, TX. In 2015, a location was added in Royce City, Texas, as part of the acquisition of Texas Leadership Bank.  Two more locations were added in the North Dallas area as part of the 2015 acquisition of Preston State Bank. Additionally, in 2015 Guaranty Bank opened a location in Rockwall.

In May 2016, the bank opened a new location in Denton, Texas. Guaranty Bank & Trust announced an additional College Station location in June 2016 before acquiring a second Denton location from Independent Bank in August.

The bank opened an additional location in Austin in November 2017 and an additional location in Fort Worth in January 2018.

Acquisitions
In 1992, Guaranty Bank & Trust acquired the First National Bank of Deport, with branches in both Deport, Texas and Paris, Texas. The company purchased a commercial bank in Bogata, Texas in 1993. Talco State Bank, chartered in 1912, merged with Guaranty Bank & Trust in 1997.

In 1999, Guaranty Bank & Trust acquired First American Financial Corporation, with its Sulphur Springs and Commerce, Texas locations, and wholly owned mortgage company. The renamed Guaranty Mortgage Company was folded into the bank in 2000.

In 2011, the Fort Stockton location was sold to West Texas State Bank. First State Bank of Hallsville, Texas merged with Guaranty Bank & Trust in August 2013.  Guaranty Bancshares acquired DCB Financial in 2015.

In 2015, Guaranty Bank & Trust acquired Preston State Bank, a subsidiary of DCB Financial Corp. Texas Leadership Bank was also acquired and its operations merged into Guaranty Bank & Trust in 2015.

On June 1, 2018, Guaranty Bank & Trust acquired Westbound Bank, N.A. of Katy, TX, facilitating entrance into the Houston, TX region.

References

Banks based in the Dallas–Fort Worth metroplex
Bonds (finance)
Banks established in 1913
1913 establishments in Texas